Wellstar Health System (formerly WellStar) is a non-profit system founded in 1993 providing comprehensive care in Metro Atlanta, Georgia, United States. It includes:

 Center for Health Transformation
 Spalding Regional Hospital
 Sylvan Grove Hospital
 Wellstar Cobb Hospital, Austell, Georgia
 Wellstar College of Health and Human Services, Kennesaw, Georgia
 Wellstar Douglas Hospital, Douglasville, Georgia
 Wellstar Kennestone Hospital, Marietta, Georgia
 Wellstar North Fulton Hospital
 Wellstar Paulding Hospital, Hiram, Georgia
 Wellstar West Georgia Medical Center LaGrange, Georgia
 Wellstar Windy Hill Hospital, Marietta, Georgia

Former campuses:
 Atlanta Medical Center South Campus
 Atlanta Medical Center

External links

References

Healthcare in Georgia (U.S. state)